Orangeville Township is one of ten townships in Orange County, Indiana, United States. As of the 2010 census, its population was 658 and it contained 278 housing units.

Geography

Unincorporated towns
 Orangeville at 
(This list is based on USGS data and may include former settlements.)

Cemeteries
The township contains Independent Order of Odd Fellows Cemetery.

School districts
 Orleans Community Schools

Political districts
 Indiana's 9th congressional district
 State House District 62
 State Senate District 48

References
 
 United States Census Bureau 2008 TIGER/Line Shapefiles
 IndianaMap

External links
 Indiana Township Association
 United Township Association of Indiana
 City-Data.com page for Orangeville Township

Townships in Orange County, Indiana
Townships in Indiana